The 1977 Colgate-Palmolive Grand Prix was a professional tennis circuit administered by the International Lawn Tennis Federation (ILTF, later the ITF) which served as a forerunner to the current Association of Tennis Professionals (ATP) World Tour and the Women's Tennis Association (WTA) Tour. The circuit consisted of the four modern Grand Slam tournaments and open tournaments recognised by the ILTF. The Colgate-Palmolive Masters is included in this calendar but did not count towards the Grand Prix ranking. Colgate-Palmolive was the new tour sponsor, taking over from Commercial Union. Guillermo Vilas won the Grand Prix circuit, having accumulated the most points (2,047), and received the largest share from the bonus pool ($300,000). The top eight points ranked singles players as well as the top four doubles teams qualified for the season-ending Masters tournament

Schedule
Key

December 1976

January

February

March

April

May

June

July

August

September

October

November

December

January 1978

Points system
The Grand Prix tournaments were divided into seven groups. Group TC consisted of the Grand Slam tournaments; the Australian Open, French Open, Wimbledon Championships and the US Open—while the other tournaments were given star ratings ranging from six stars to one star, based on prize money and draw size. Points were allocated based on these ratings and the finishing position of a player in a tournament. No points were awarded to first-round losers, and ties were settled by the number of tournaments played. The points allocation, with doubles points listed in brackets, is as follows:

Standings
The 1977 Grand Prix tournaments were divided in seven separate point categories, ranging from the Triple Crown tournaments (250 points for the winner) to the smallest One Star tournaments (50 points for the winner). At the end of the year the 35 top-ranked players received a bonus from the bonus pool. To qualify for a bonus a player must have played at least 15 tournaments. The top eight points ranked singles players and top four doubles teams were entitled to participate in  the season-ending Masters tournament.

ATP rankings

List of tournament winners
The list of winners and number of Grand Prix singles titles won, alphabetically by last number of titles:
 Guillermo Vilas (16) Springfield, Buenos Aires, Virginia Beach, French Open, Kitzbühel, Washington, D.C., Louisville, South Orange, Columbus, US Open, Paris, Tehran, Bogotá, Santiago, Buenos Aires, Johannesburg
 Björn Borg (10) Boca Raton, Memphis, Nice, Denver, Madrid, Barcelona, Wimbledon, Basel, Cologne, Wembley
 Vitas Gerulaitis (5) Ocean City, Rome, Brisbane, Perth, Australian Open (December)
 Brian Gottfried (5) Baltimore, Palm Springs, Washington Indoor, La Costa, Vienna
 Jeff Borowiak (3) Dayton, Gstaad, Montreal
 Jimmy Connors (3) Las Vegas, Maui, Sydney Indoor
 Tim Gullikson (3) Newport, Taiwan, Adelaide
 Sandy Mayer (3) Little Rock, Hampton, Stockholm
 Manuel Orantes (3) Indianapolis, Boston, Tokyo Outdoor
 Vijay Amritraj (2) Auckland, Bombay
 Corrado Barazzutti (2) Båstad, Paris Bercy
 Paolo Bertolucci (2) Hamburg, Berlin
 Eddie Dibbs (2) Miami, Oviedo
 Raúl Ramírez (2) Queen's Club, Los Angeles
 Harold Solomon (2) Brussels, Cincinnati
 Roscoe Tanner (2) Australian Open (January), Sydney Outdoor
 John Alexander (1) North Conway
 Mark Cox (1) Helsinki
 Victor Amaya (1) Adelaide
 Wojciech Fibak (1) Düsseldorf
 Željko Franulović (1) Munich
 José Higueras (1) Murcia
 Jiří Hřebec (1) San Jose
 Karl Meiler (1) Manila
 Ilie Năstase (1) Aix-en-Provence
 Andrew Pattison (1) Laguna Niguel
 Patrick Proisy (1) Hilversum
 Ken Rosewall (1) Hong Kong
 Stan Smith (1) Los Angeles PSW
 Brian Teacher (1) Jackson
 Butch Walts (1) San Francisco

The following players won their first title in 1977:
 Victor Amaya Adelaide
 Tim Gullikson Newport
 Chris Kachel Manila
 Patrick Proisy Hilversum
 Brian Teacher Jackson

See also
1977 World Championship Tennis circuit
1977 WTA Tour

References

External links
ATP 1977 results archive

Further reading

 
Grand Prix tennis circuit seasons
Grand Prix